Brienz-Surava is a former municipality in the district of Albula in the canton of Grisons, Switzerland.

It was created in 1869 as a merger between Brienz/Brinzauls and Surava. It ceased to exist in 1883, when the two municipalities were separated.

Albula/Alvra
Former municipalities of Graubünden